Gigoomgan is a rural locality in the Fraser Coast Region, Queensland, Australia.

History 
In 1887,  of land were resumed from the Gigoomgan consolidated pastoral run for the establishment of small farms. The land was offered for selection on 17 April 1887.

References 

Fraser Coast Region
Localities in Queensland